Platactis  is a genus of moths of the family Oecophoridae of moths.  There is only one species in this genus of moths: Platactis hormathota Meyrick, 1911 that is found in the Seychelles.

One fact about this species of moth is that it has a wingspan of 16-18mm.

References
Markku Savela's ftp.funet.fi

Oecophoridae